AHCC, or active hexose correlated compound, is an alpha-glucan rich nutritional supplement produced from the mycelia  of shiitake (Lentinula edodes) of the basidiomycete family of mushrooms. The product/supplement/compound-mix is a subject of research as a potential anti-cancer agent but has not been conclusively found to treat cancer or any other disease, and there are conflict of interest concerns about the published research. AHCC is a popular alternative medicine in Japan.

AHCC is a registered trademark of and manufactured by Amino Up Co., Ltd. in Sapporo City, Hokkaido, Japan.

Development and Chemical composition 
AHCC was developed by Amino Up Chemical Co., LTD. and Dr. Toshihiko Okamoto (School of Pharmaceutical Sciences, University of Tokyo)  in 1989.

Polysaccharides form a large part of the composition of AHCC. These include beta-glucan (β-glucan) and acetylated α-glucan. Acetylated α-glucan, produced by culturing the mushroom mycelia, is unique to AHCC. Approximately 20% of the make up of AHCC is α-glucans.

Glucans are saccharides, of which some are known to have immune stimulating effects.

Potential Mechanisms of Action 
The manufacturer of AHCC states that the culturing process utilized in its manufacture favors the release of small bioactive molecules that act as nontoxic agonists for toll-like receptors (TLRs), specifically TLR-4, initiating a systemic anti-inflammatory response. AHCC is believed to bind to TLR-2 and TLR-4, and act as an immune modulator, as Immune cells such as CD4+ and CD8+ T cells and natural killer (NK) cells will produce cytokines by either cytokine stimulation by dendritic cells or ligand binding to TLRs.

Use in Integrative Medicine 
AHCC is widely used in Japan and China. It is available to the general public in Japan and China without a prescription and many people use it for general health maintenance and treatment of acute infections.

It is often used as a Complementary and Alternative Medicine (CAM) for immune support, as reports in animal and clinical settings have indicated that AHCC is associated with an enhanced response to infection and increased survival. AHCC is in some cases also used by those undergoing conventional cancer therapy (e.g. chemotherapy) for its reported immunomodulatory functions.

In Japan, AHCC is the 2nd most popular complementary and alternative medicine used by cancer patients.  Agaricus blazei supplements are the most popular, outpacing AHCC use by a factor of 7:1.

Research  

Nearly all of the research into AHCC has been funded by the manufacturer, which complicates the discussion of currently available results – independent research is needed to verify them. The mechanism of action of AHCC is poorly understood and there is little known about its safety.  clinical research into AHCC has been of poor quality: there are no large-scale studies or randomized controlled trials.

Laboratory research suggests AHCC may have immunostimulatory effects.

AHCC has been proposed as a treatment for cancer, but research into its effectiveness has produced only uncertain and inconclusive evidence. Detailed research is needed into the pharmacology of AHCC before any recommendation of its use as an adjuvant therapy can be made.

Studies have suggested that AHCC supplementation may affect immune outcomes and immune cell populations, suggesting that it has anti-inflammatory effects. Moreover, available data have demonstrated that AHCC may possibly reduce symptoms, improve survival, and shorten recovery time in animal models infected with viruses, bacteria, and fungal infections.

See also
Alternative cancer treatments
Agaricus blazei mushroom
Medicinal mushrooms
Shiitake

References 

Immune system
Cancer research
Dietary supplements